Lagorce may refer to:

 Places
 Lagorce, Ardèche, a commune in Ardèche, France
 Lagorce, Gironde, a commune in Gironde, France
 La Gorce Island, Miami Beach, Florida
 People
 Franck Lagorce, French racing driver
 Guy Lagorce (born 1937), French sprinter, journalist and writer
 Marcel Lagorce (born 1932), French classical trumpeter